Gordon Styles (4 July 1920 – 23 November 1996) was  a former Australian rules footballer who played with Richmond in the Victorian Football League (VFL).

Notes

External links 
		

1920 births
1996 deaths
Australian rules footballers from Victoria (Australia)
Richmond Football Club players